Sapattivuosi is a Finnish Black Sabbath tribute band singing in Finnish. The band was initiated as a project by vocalist Hannu Paloniemi, drummer Simo Vehmas, and guitarist Janne Halmkrona (also of CMX).  Sapattivuosi's first two albums covered songs from the Ozzy Osbourne era. Then vocalist Paloniemi left the band.  He was replaced by Marko Hietala, known from bands such as Nightwish, Tarot and Northern Kings.  Hietala first appeared with Sapattivuosi on their single Pelon lait (a cover of Neon Knights), which came out on 4 March 2009.  The band's third full-length album, Ihmisen merkki, also covers songs from Black Sabbath's Ronnie James Dio era. It was released on 1 April 2009.

All three Sapattivuosi albums made the Finnish charts, with two making the top ten.  At least two singles have also spent weeks at #4 on the charts.

Members 
 Janne Halmkrona (guitar)
 Antero Aunesluoma (bass)
 Simo Vehmas (drums)

Former members 
 Hannu Paloniemi (vocals) (2000–2009)
 Marko Hietala (vocals, acoustic guitar) (2009–2013)

Discography

Albums

Sapattivuosi (2003)

Sapattivuosi Vol. 2 (2005)

Ihmisen merkki (2009)

Singles 
 "Hautuumaan lapset" (2003)
 "Kännin piikkiin" (2005)
 "Pelon lait" (2009)

References

External links 
 Sapattivuosi Official website
Debut album review 4/5 (in Finnish)
 Sapattivuosi on Last.fm

Finnish rock music groups
Tribute bands